Salbiah binti Haji Sulaiman (born 5 August 1952) is a Bruneian former politician. She served as a member of the Legislative Council from 2011 to 2016.

Biography
Binti Sulaiman was born in Brunei in 1952. She was educated at Berakas primary school, Raja Isteri Girls' High School and Sultan Omar Ali Saifuddien College. She then attended the Oxford College of Further Education in the United Kingdom, before earning a BA in social studies from the University of East Anglia in 1978.

Binti Sulaiman started her career in 1978 as an education officer. She spent a year at the Institute of Education in Singapore from 1980 to 1981. From 1982 to 1993, she was a research officer for the Ministry of Foreign Affairs. From 1993 to 2005, she was deputy director for the Internal Security Department (ISD). In August 2005, she was named deputy permanent secretary for the Prime Minister's Office (PMO), and permanent secretary in December 2006. In August 2007, she officially retired from the PMO.

In 2011 binti Sulaiman was appointed to the Legislative Council as a representative of 'people who have achieved excellence'. She and Zasia binti Sirin were the first female members of the Legislative Council. She remained a member until 2016.

References

1952 births
Living people
Alumni of the University of East Anglia
Bruneian civil servants
Bruneian women in politics
Members of the Legislative Council of Brunei
21st-century women politicians